Paul Mason (born 23 January 1960) is a British commentator and radio personality. He was Culture and Digital Editor of Channel 4 News, becoming the programme's Economics Editor on 1 June 2014, a post he formerly held on BBC Two's Newsnight programme. He is the author of several books, and a visiting professor at the University of Wolverhampton.

Early life and education
Mason was born in Leigh, Lancashire. His father, John Mason (1927–86), was a lorry driver for Ward & Goldstone Ltd. His mother, Julia (née Lewis, born 1935), was headmistress of St Margaret Mary's Primary School, Hindley Green. One grandparent was a miner and another was a Lithuanian-Jewish violinist.

Mason was educated at St Joseph's RC Primary School in Leigh and Thornleigh Salesian College in Bolton, which was a grammar school when Mason attended in the 1970s. He graduated from the University of Sheffield with a degree in music and politics in 1981 and trained to be a music teacher at London University Institute of Education, after which he undertook postgraduate research into the music of the Second Viennese School at the University of Sheffield until 1984.

Mason lived in Leicester from 1982 to 1988, working as a music teacher and lecturer in music at Loughborough University.

Journalism and broadcasting

Mason has lived in London since 1988, becoming a freelance journalist around 1991. From 1995 to 2001 he worked for Reed Business Information, a division of Reed Elsevier, on titles including Contract Journal, Community Care and Computer Weekly, of which he was deputy editor. During the dotcom boom, Mason launched E-Business Review and was consulting editor for the launch of CW360.com. He also contributed articles to the Daily Express and The Mail on Sunday.

In August 2001, Mason joined the BBC Two television programme Newsnight taking up a post as Business Editor. His first live appearance on Newsnight was on the day of the September 11 attacks in 2001.

In the run up to the 2005 G8 Gleneagles conference, Mason was one of the first journalists at the BBC to be permitted to write a blog. His blog "Idle Scrawl" was later incorporated into Newsnights "Talk About Newsnight" blog.

In May 2007, Mason's book Live Working or Die Fighting: How the Working Class Went Global was published by Harvill Secker. The book was longlisted for the Guardian First Book Award on 24 August 2007. In June 2007, Mason presented Spinning Yarns, a four-part series on the history of the cotton industry for BBC Radio Four. Mason appeared as the key talent in a new five-part BBC series Credit Crash Britain, first broadcast on BBC Two on 30 October 2008.

In January 2012 Mason's book Why It's Kicking Off Everywhere: The New Global Revolutions was published in paperback by Verso.

Mason attended the Wigan Casino in his youth as a follower of Northern Soul and hosted a documentary about the Northern Soul scene for the BBC's The Culture Show in September 2013.

In August 2013, it was announced that Mason would join Channel 4 News as its culture and digital editor. In May 2014, it was announced that he would become the programme's Economics Editor at the beginning of the following month, replacing Faisal Islam.

Mason announced in February 2016 that he was leaving his position at Channel 4 News in favour of freelancing so he could engage more fully in debates on the political left without the constraint of impartiality observed by broadcasters in the UK.

His four-part documentary series #ThisIsACoup covered the 2015 Greek crisis from inside and outside the corridors of power. His documentary series K is for Karl commemorated the ideas of Karl Marx on the 200th anniversary of Marx’s birth, whilst most recent series, R is for Rosa, was commissioned by the Rosa Luxemburg Foundation to mark the centenary of the Polish-German revolutionary.

He writes a weekly column for the New Statesman, and contributes to The Guardian, Der Freitag and Le Monde Diplomatique. He is a frequent guest on opinion-forming TV and radio shows, including Newsnight, DemocracyNow!, Politics Live, Any Questions and Question Time.

Playwright

In 2017, Mason wrote Divine Chaos of Starry Things, a two act play looking at the life of Louise Michel and other exiles from the 1871 Paris Commune in exile in New Caledonia. The Guardian described it as "a frustrating, clunky but always intelligent drama focusing on the women in New Caledonia, and particularly the revolutionary Louise Michel. While her comrades take refuge in drink and hopes of appeal against their sentences, Michel keeps the red flag flying. She recognises that the oppression of the Kanaks and of the Parisian working class are one and the same".

Awards
Mason won the Wincott Prize for Business Journalism in 2003, the Workworld Broadcaster of the Year in 2004, and the Diageo African Business Reporting Award in 2007. His report on the social movements behind Bolivian president Evo Morales was cited when Newsnight was awarded the Orwell Prize (2007).

In 2018, Paul received the Ellen Meiksins Wood Prize for his work on Postcapitalism. In 2020, he was awarded the Erich Fromm Prize, in recognition of his work on the revival of humanist Marxism.

Political consulting
Mason is the sole director of a political consulting and media firm called Exarcheia Ltd. At least one member of the shadow front bench has been reported (via the Independent Parliamentary Standards Authority) to have used Exarcheia's services in 2021.

Controversies

Antisemitism 
In March 2018, it was reported that Mason had been a member of the Facebook group 'Palestine Live', where antisemitic posts were widely shared. He said that while he was a member of the group, he was added to it in 2014 without his knowledge by someone else, and that he does not read or endorse the content of all Facebook groups of which he is part. Mason suggested the group be closed and investigated if it contained antisemitism.

Anti-Catholicism 
In January 2020, Tom Harris and Portia Berry-Kilby accused Paul Mason of anti-Catholicism after he tweeted "I don't want Labour's policy on reproductive rights dictated by the Vatican, thanks", in response to comments made by Labour leadership candidate Rebecca Long-Bailey on abortion during a meeting with representatives of the Roman Catholic Diocese of Salford. He later went on to state, "I went to a Catholic grammar school in 1970s, taught by ultra-violent priests, and spent my early years in the Labour Party fighting the anti-abortionists on exactly this issue. There's no place for the misogynistic thugs of the Vatican in Labour politics."

Politics

Mason is a former member of the Workers' Power group. He responded to an interviewer from the Evening Standard in 2011: "It's on Wikipedia that I was, so it must be true. It's fair to say I was a Leftie activist. What my politics are now are very complicated." In an interview with The Independent in 2015, he described himself as having been a "supporter" of the group.

In a speech in 2015 marking the publication of Naomi Klein's book This Changes Everything, he declared that "capitalism is dying". Mason has called for an alliance of "bond traders from Canary Wharf, arm in arm with placard-carrying Trots" against right-wing populist groups such as UKIP. Mason later described UKIP voters in unfavourable terms, stating, "They are toe-rags, basically. They are the bloke who nicks your bike".

In 2016, Mason distanced himself from his former involvement in far-left Trotskyist politics, by saying that he no longer holds such views and identifies with a "radical social democracy". Responding to comments by the then-Chancellor of the Exchequer George Osborne, he said:

As to Mr Osborne's claim that I am "revolutionary Marxist" it is completely inaccurate. I am radical social democrat who favours the creation of a peer-to-peer sector (co-ops, open source etc) alongside the market and the state, as part of a long transition to a post-capitalist economy. There's a comprehensive critique of Bolshevism in my latest book, Postcapitalism: A Guide to Our Future.

Mason subsequently wrote positively about Marxism: in a piece for New Statesman published in May 2018 for the bicentenary of Marx's birth, he praised Marxist humanism inspired by Marx's Economic and Philosophic Manuscripts of 1844 in general, and the thought of Raya Dunayevskaya in particular, for its emphasis on overcoming alienation from labour in order to achieve individual freedom, whilst criticising the authoritarianism of Stalinism and the structural Marxism of the likes of Louis Althusser. In another New Statesman article published the following year he described himself as an "actual Marxist", whilst critiquing determinist interpretations of Marx which posit Marxism as a "theory of everything".

In June 2016, Mason supported Labour Party leader Jeremy Corbyn after mass resignations from his cabinet and a leadership challenge. He wrote in The Guardian: "But one thing I do know: Corbyn is incapable of lying to the British people; he is inured to elite politics; he didn't spend his entire life in a Machiavellian project to gain power and an invitation to Oleg Deripaska's yacht. That's why I voted for him and will do so again if you trigger a leadership vote."

In September 2016, he told the website The Canary: "Instead of attacking Momentum, any social democrat with an ounce of knowledge of Labour history should welcome it, even if they disagree with its politics... It is a genuine movement of the Labour left; it stands in the long tradition of radical social democracy, going back to Robert Blatchford's Clarion movement before 1914, or the ILP in the 1920s."

In the New Statesman magazine in June 2018, Mason argued the case for state suppression of "fascists", saying that he favoured a policy of using "the full panoply of security measures to deter and monitor" those he described as "racists" and added: "For clarity, unlike many on the left, that means I am in favour of state suppression of fascist groups." He finished his article by saying that "The progressive half of Britain needs a narrative to overcome this threat: a narrative based on shared, historic values of democracy and tolerance", and also "[to] stop pandering to right-wing nationalism and xenophobia and start fighting it."

In May 2022, in a The Spectator podcast, Mason said he was a supporter of Keir Starmer as Labour leader in the aftermath of the Beergate COVID-19 regulations breach allegations.

The same month, Mason was longlisted to be the Labour candidate for the safe seat of Stretford and Urmston in Greater Manchester, succeeding the retiring MP Kate Green. However, he did not make the shortlist, which was announced in June 2022. In October 2022, Mason tried for selection for Sheffield Central to replace Labour MP Paul Bloomfield, but here too failed to make the shortlist. In March 2023, Mason stated his intention to run for selection for the new seat of Mid & South Pembrokeshire.

Personal life
Mason was Father of the Chapel for the National Union of Journalists on Newsnight. He is a supporter of Leigh Centurions rugby league club and Manchester United F.C. He is married to nurse Jane Bruton, and is an atheist.

Books

References

External links

 
 Mason at London's Frontline Club, 23 April 2009
 Official website of BBC's Newsnight programme
 Paul Mason bio on BBC website
 Website of Live Working or Die Fighting
 Website of Meltdown, the End of the Age of Greed
 Mason on Live Working or Die Fighting: How the Working Class Went Global – video interview by Democracy Now!
 Daily Telegraph
 Interview Mute magazine 2012
 Interview with Canadian Broadcasting Corporation – Ideas with Paul Kennedy – Posted 25 Nov 2015

1960 births
Living people
Academics of Loughborough University
Alumni of the University of Sheffield
BBC newsreaders and journalists
ITN newsreaders and journalists
English socialists
English atheists
English trade unionists
English republicans
English anti-fascists
English Trotskyists
English people of Lithuanian-Jewish descent
Critics of the Catholic Church
Labour Party (UK) people
People from Leigh, Greater Manchester
People educated at Thornleigh Salesian College